State Highway 48 (SH 48) runs from Brownsville to Port Isabel in Deep South Texas.

Route description
SH 48 begins at an intersection with Business Route 77 and the southern terminus of U.S. Route 281 on the west side of Brownsville.  the road travels east through Brownsville on Boca Chica Boulevard, intersecting I-69E/US 77/US 83.  It turns northeast at an intersection with SH 4 and past the Port of Brownsville (the former routing travels through the port grounds).  The route then travels across the sandy flats near the coast of the Gulf of Mexico, before reaching its eastern terminus at SH 100 on the far northwestern edge of Port Isabel.

Route history

SH 48 was originally designated on August 21, 1923 from Daingerfield east through Linden to Atlanta as a renumbering of a portion of SH 1A. On June 24, 1931, this route was redesignated as a rerouting of SH 47. SH 48 was instead designated on that same day from Pharr through Harlingen to Brownsville, along the current route of U.S. Highway 83. On November 30, 1932, it extended west to Mission, replacing part of SH 4. On January 19, 1935, this route was swapped with SH 4, which ran closer to the Rio Grande along Military Highway, and was extended east out of the city to the Port of Brownsville. On September 26, 1939, it was replaced an extension of SH 107 from Mission to Hidalgo and US 281 from Hidalgo to Brownsville, so that only the section from Brownsville to the port was left. On October 28, 1973, SH 48, was signed to Port Isabel along Farm to Market Road 1792. On August 26, 1990, it was officially extended over Farm to Market Road 1792.

Major intersections

References

048
Transportation in Cameron County, Texas